Isopropyl acetate is an ester, an organic compound which is the product of esterification of acetic acid and isopropanol.  It is a clear, colorless liquid with a characteristic fruity odor.

Isopropyl acetate is a solvent with a wide variety of manufacturing uses that is miscible with most other organic solvents, and slightly soluble in water (although less so than ethyl acetate).  It is used as a solvent for cellulose, plastics, oil and fats.  It is a component of some printing inks and perfumes.

Isopropyl acetate decomposes slowly on contact with steel in the presence of air, producing acetic acid and isopropanol. It reacts violently with oxidizing materials and it attacks many plastics.

Isopropyl acetate is quite flammable in both its liquid and vapor forms, and it may be harmful if swallowed or inhaled.

The Occupational Safety and Health Administration has set a permissible exposure limit (PEL) of 250ppm (950mg/m3) over an eight-hour time-weighted average for workers handling isopropyl acetate.

References

Flavors
Ester solvents
Acetate esters
Isopropyl esters
Sweet-smelling chemicals